MoHo (known as Ball Breakers in North America) is a video game developed by Lost Toys and published by Take-Two Interactive for PlayStation, Dreamcast, and Microsoft Windows in 2000.

Reception

The PlayStation version received average reviews, while the PC version received unfavorable reviews, according to the review aggregation website GameRankings. Chris Charla of NextGen called the former version "The Running Man meets Marble Madness: surprisingly fun, especially for less than the cost of two boxes of Cheerios." 

Reviewing the PlayStation version Greg Howson of The Guardian awarded the title 4/5 stars, commending its gameplay which he described as "mixing Marble Madness, skateboarding and future sport" and "remarkable graphical effects on a machine already drawing its pension".

Official Dreamcast Magazine's Steve Key rated it as 3/10, describing the character movement as like "slow, awkward muppets rolling about like a drunken version of It's a Knockout...but with absolutely no fun at all" and damning the title as "probably the most boring game on Dreamcast".

References

External links
 

2000 video games
Action video games
Dreamcast games
Fantasy sports video games
Multiplayer and single-player video games
PlayStation (console) games
Take-Two Interactive games
Video games about death games
Video games developed in the United Kingdom
Video games set in the future
Windows games